Thena (born Azura) is a character appearing in American comic books published by Marvel Comics. Created by Martin A. Burnstein and Jack Kirby, the character first appeared as Minerva in Red Raven Comics #1 (August 1940), but was later reintroduced as Thena in The Eternals #5 (November 1976). She is a member of the Eternals, a race of superhumans in the Marvel Universe. She was also a member of Heroes for Hire.

Angelina Jolie portrays Thena in the 2021 Marvel Cinematic Universe film Eternals.

Publication history

Thena first appeared in The Eternals #5 (November 1976). She was created by Martin A. Burnstein and Jack Kirby. Marvel Comics continuity was later retconned so that the character presented as the mythological god Minerva, introduced in Red Raven Comics #1 (August 1940), was actually Thena.

The character appeared in  the ongoing series The Eternals, written by Jack Kirby and later in a Thor storyline that ran from Thor #291-301,.

She become one of the main characters of the Eternals (vol. 2) in 1985 written by Peter B. Gillis and penciler Sal Buscema, and in the one-shot comic called The Eternals: The Herod Factor #1 in 1991.

Fictional character biography

Beginnings 

Thena was born in the city of Olympia in ancient Greece, and is thus one of the Eternals of Olympia. Originally named Azura, but her father Zuras had her name changed by royal decree to resemble that of Zeus' daughter Athena (Roman name Minerva) to seal the treaty between the Olympian gods and the Eternals, in which the Eternals would act as the gods representatives on Earth, with Thena serving as Athena's personal representative. Due to this, she has often been mistaken for Athena and Minerva. The city of Athens was apparently built for her, not the goddess, although Thena later allowed it to be conquered by the Spartans in 404 B.C.

Thena became a scholar and a warrior as she grew. She encountered Kro in Babylon 2,500 years ago. He had a chance to slay her, but did not; as the years passed, the two of them grew closer together. Thena and Kro made love during the Vietnam War, resulting in Thena becoming pregnant with twins. She placed them inside of Ms. Ritter, an infertile woman, who raised them as her own twin children, Donald and Deborah.

Modern Age 
In recent times, the eternals and deviants revealed themselves to the human world. When Warlord Kro led his armies in an attack on New York City, Thena opposed him to help rescue Sersi. Thena was reunited with Kro, and publicly declared herself to be an Eternal. After Kro called a truce, he brought her to the Deviant city of Lemuria to try to resume his relationship with her. However Thena was horrified with the Deviants' customs including the mass killing of undesirables. Thena meet Brother Tode, the leader of the deviants and watched a gladiator match between Deviant champions. She watched that Ransak the Reject, a genetically stable Deviant was fighting the horribly mutated but well-mannered Karkas. Thena was convinced by Karkas to grant both of them sanctuary and take them under her protection, running away from Lemuria with them. She then participated in the Uni-Mind with other Eternals to decide what to do with the Celestial crisis. With Karkas and the Reject, she battled Zakka and Tutinax. She met and became an ally of Thor, and then battled Athena of Olympus, during a battle between the Olympian gods and Eternals.

She and the rest of the Etenals were captured by the Deviants aristocracy, but were rescued by Iron Man (James Rhodes). Thena was contacted by her father's spirit and proposed to the Eternals the need of going to the space. She then formed the Uni-Mind again, to decide the matter and battled Maelstrom alongside the Avengers; she was chosen by the Uni-Mind to stay on Earth. After Zuras' death and the subsequent departure of most of Earth's Eternals, Thena became Prime Eternal (leader of the Eternals of Earth), but she was traumatized by her father's death and was being subtly influenced by a Brain-Mine Kro had placed upon her. Thena was angry when few eternals assisted to her crowning ceremony. In a new conflict with the deviants, Thena meet Kro again and helped him to escape from High Priest Ghaur's control.  She thwarted the other Eternals' efforts against Kro and turned against Ikaris to help save Kro's life, but later relinquished her title to Ikaris after a ceremony, and was banished. She was captured with Kro by Ghaur, and freed from Kro's brain mine; when she learned of the Brain-Mine, she was furious with Kro. She battled Ghaur alongside the Eternals, Thor, and the West Coast Avengers.

Some time later a maddened Dr. Damian transformed Ajak into a monster through the use of Celestial technology, sending them to kill Thena and Kro's twin children, Donald & Deborah Ritter. The monstrous Ajak killed many sets of twins along the way. After the Eternals restored Ajak to their true form, suddenly grief-stricken with the deeds that committed as a monster, Ajak committed suicide, additionally disintegrating Dr. Damian himself. Thena was reunited with her children and Kro, forming a family. Thena then sent Gilgamesh to help the Avengers, and later helped the superhero group in the fight against Proctor and his Gatherers. Kro and Thena searched for their children when they were captured by the villain Maelstrom. When the mad priest Ghaur tried to form an Anti-Mind, he captured the twins and Thena. Kro led his deviant faction to rescue his children and his lover, with help of the Heroes for Hire. However he was outmatched by Ghaur's power and kept up the fight as his family escaped. Later, Thena and the rest of  the Eternals had to fight Apocalypse and posed as a superhero group.

Memory loss and Aftermath 
In the 2006 Eternals title, Thena began as normal woman married to Thomas Eliot with a son, Joey, and a researcher at Stark Enterprises. Like Sersi and Makkari, she was affected by Sprite's reality warping to have no memory of her past as an Eternal. Thena assisted at a Vorozheika party organized by Sersi. In the party, the amnesic eternals were attacked by mercenaries of another faction of Vorozheika government, killing her husband. The reunion of four eternals triggered a recovery of their powers. With their returned powers, Thena frees herself from the mercenaries that captured her. Afterwards, she began to suffer terrible nightmares in which she was indeed immortal, and fought off various multicolored Deviants with ease. When she awoke from one of these dreams, she found she had gained back her costume and powers. The Eternals, now remembering their past, arrived to San Francisco to deal with the Dreaming Celestial.They realized that they cannot stop the Celestial (they are programmed to protect him) and  leave him be. The Eternals then embark on a quest to go and recruit the other members who have similarly forgotten their true selves due to Sprite's trickery. Thena remained one of the Eternals, keeping her (human) child with her in their home after a heated argument with Ikaris.

Thena kept caring for Joey and began to bicker with Ikaris for the method of awakening Eternals. She did not recognize that her son was host to a Horde' scout.

Death
Later when the Celestials' Final Host arrived on Earth, Thena along with all the Eternals killed themselves after realizing the true purpose for which they were created.

Powers and abilities
Thena is a member of the race of superhumans known as the Eternals. As a result, she has superhuman strength, speed, stamina, durability, agility, and reflexes. Thena also possesses the ability to manipulate cosmic energy to augment her life force, granting her virtual invulnerability and immortality, the ability to project cosmic energy from her eyes or hands in the form of heat, light, or concussive force and possibly other powers. Thena has total mental control over her physical form, granting virtual invulnerability and immortality. She also has the ability to levitate herself and thus fly at superhuman speed, the psionic ability to rearrange the molecular structure of objects, the ability to cast illusions to disguise her appearance and that of others from the perceptions of normal human beings, the ability to teleport herself and others with her, and the ability to initiate formation of the Uni-Mind.

Thena has a gifted intellect, and has studied under the greatest Eternal and human scholars throughout her lifetime. She is highly educated in numerous areas of Eternal and human knowledge. Thena is also a formidable hand-to-hand combatant, with extensive training in unarmed combat and the use of many ancient and Eternal high-tech weapons.

Thena wears body armor of unknown composition. She carries a bow that fires arrows that release "cold energy", and she carries an energy spear that surrounds victims with a ring of intense heat and light or bombards them with anti-gravitons.

Reception

Accolades 

 In 2019, CBR.com ranked Thena 6th in their "The 15 Most Powerful Eternals" list.
 In 2021, Screen Rant ranked Thena 2nd in their "10 Most Powerful Members Of The Eternals" list 
 In 2021, CBR.com ranked Thena 7th in their "10 Strongest Characters From Eternals Comics" list.
 In 2022, Syfy ranked Thena 4th in their "5 Marvel heroines who deserve their own MCU movie franchise" list.

Other versions

MC2 
In Avengers-Next issue #2, It is revealed that Thor had a daughter in the alternate timeline, who is also called Thena, and possesses her father's storm god powers.

In other media

Television
 Thena appears in Marvel Knights: Eternals, voiced by Lisa Ann Beley.

Film
 Thena appears in Eternals, portrayed by Angelina Jolie. This version suffers from "Mahd Wy'ry", a condition which the Eternals believe to be the result of accumulating so many memories over their centuries-long lives. They later discover that it is the result of an unsuccessful mind-wipe, which is performed on every Eternal after completing a mission. She has a close bond with Gilgamesh and faces off against Kro.

Video games 
 Thena appears as an unlockable playable character in Marvel Super War.
 Thena appears as an unlockable playable character in Marvel Future Fight.
 Thena appears as a companion character in Marvel Future Revolution.

References

Further reading

External links
Thena at Marvel.com

Characters created by Jack Kirby
Comics characters introduced in 1976
Eternals (comics)
Fictional archers
Fictional characters with immortality
Fictional characters with superhuman durability or invulnerability
Fictional polearm and spearfighters
Fictional women soldiers and warriors
Marvel Comics characters who can move at superhuman speeds
Marvel Comics characters who have mental powers
Marvel Comics characters who can teleport
Marvel Comics characters with accelerated healing
Marvel Comics characters with superhuman strength
Marvel Comics female superheroes
Marvel Comics telekinetics
Marvel Comics telepaths